Ian Payne may refer to:

 Ian Payne (sports broadcaster) (born 1962), British television sports broadcaster 
 Ian Payne (newsreader) (born 1968), British television newsreader
 Ian Payne (New Zealand cricketer) (1921–2011), New Zealand cricketer
 Ian Payne (English cricketer) (born 1958), English cricketer
 Ian Payne (South African cricketer) (1949–2015), South African cricketer
 Ian Payne (footballer) (born 1947), Australian rules footballer